Mare Serenitatis  (Latin serēnitātis, the "Sea of Serenity") is a lunar mare located to the east of Mare Imbrium on the Moon.

Geology
Mare Serenitatis is located within the Serenitatis basin, which is of the Nectarian epoch. The material surrounding the mare is of the Lower Imbrian epoch, while the mare material is of the Upper Imbrian epoch. The most noticeable feature is the crater Posidonius on the northeast rim of the mare. The ring feature to the west of the mare is indistinct, except for Montes Haemus. Mare Serenitatis connects with Mare Tranquillitatis to the southeast and borders Mare Vaporum to the southwest. Mare Serenitatis is an example of a mascon, an anomalous gravitational region on the moon.

A mass concentration (mascon), or gravitational high, was identified in the center of Mare Serenitatis from Doppler tracking of the five Lunar Orbiter spacecraft in 1968.  The mascon was confirmed and mapped at higher resolution with later orbiters such as Lunar Prospector and GRAIL.

Names
Like most of the other maria on the Moon, Mare Serenitatis was named by Giovanni Riccioli, whose 1651 nomenclature system has become standardized. Previously, William Gilbert had cited it as within the Regio Magna Occidentalis ("Large Western Region") in his map of c.1600. Pierre Gassendi had included it as part of the 'Homuncio' ('little man'), referring to a small humanoid figure that he could see among the maria; Gassendi also referred to it as 'Thersite' after Thersites, the ugliest warrior in the Trojan War. Michael van Langren had labelled it the Mare Eugenianum ("Eugenia's Sea") in his 1645 map, in honour of Isabella Clara Eugenia, queen of the Spanish Netherlands. And Johannes Hevelius included it within Pontus Euxinus (after the classical name for the Black Sea) in his 1647 map.

Exploration
Both Luna 21 and Apollo 17 landed near the eastern border of Mare Serenitatis, in the area of the Montes Taurus range. Apollo 17 landed specifically in the Taurus-Littrow valley, and Luna 21 landed in Le Monnier crater. SpaceIL's Beresheet lunar lander was planned to land in Mare Serenitatis, but crashed into the surface on 11 April 2019. Its final resting place was about 33°N, 19°E, near to the centre of the mare.

Views

In popular culture
Mare Serenitatis forms one of the eyes for the Man in the Moon.
In the animation Pretty Guardian Sailor Moon Crystal, Mare Serenitatis is the location of Silver Millennium and the original Moon Castle.
Mare Serenitatis is also mentioned in Arthur C. Clarke's short story The Sentinel.
Most of the action in John Wyndham's 1933 short story "The Last Lunarians" takes place on the edge of the Sea of Serenity.
Mare Serentitatis borders the Authority moon colony in Robert Heinlein's novel The Moon is a Harsh Mistress.
The most southern part of Mare Serenitatis is depicted on the cover of the album Apollo - Atmospheres and Soundtracks by Brian Eno, Roger Eno, and Daniel Lanois (1982). The photograph on the cover is AS17-150-23069, made during the mission of Apollo 17 in December 1972.
"Mare Serenitatis" is the name of a Frigate-type spaceship playable in Infinite Lagrange, a game developed and published by NetEase Games.

See also
Volcanism on the Moon

References

External links
 
Mare Serenitatis at The Moon Wiki
 
 
 
 

 
Serenitatis
Serenitatis
Serenitatis